Żywiec Landscape Park (Żywiecki Park Krajobrazowy) is a protected area (Landscape Park) in southern Poland.

The Park lies within Silesian Voivodeship and is named after the town of Żywiec.

Landscape parks in Poland
Parks in Silesian Voivodeship
Protected areas established in 1986
1986 establishments in Poland